Packed! is the fifth album by rock group Pretenders, released in 1990.

Besides band leader Chrissie Hynde, no other person is pictured anywhere within the album package. At the time the album was recorded, the only other remaining official member from the band's previous album was drummer Blair Cunningham, who plays on all tracks, though he is not credited as part of the band. As all other musicians appearing on the album are session musicians, some observers have characterized the album as a Hynde solo recording using the Pretenders name to satisfy contractual obligations. However, the lineup that recorded the album has some consistency with past studio lineups of the band: guitarist Billy Bremner, who had previously played with the band as a session musician on their "Back on the Chain Gang"/"My City Was Gone" single, appears on most of the tracks, as does bassist John McKenzie, who had played some bass on the band's previous album, Get Close.

Track listing
All songs by Chrissie Hynde, except where noted.

"Never Do That" – 3:20
"Let's Make a Pact" – 3:18
"Millionaires" – 3:04
"May This Be Love" (Jimi Hendrix) – 2:43
"No Guarantee" – 3:47
"When Will I See You" (Hynde, Johnny Marr) – 4:53
"Sense of Purpose" – 3:03
"Downtown (Akron)" – 2:43
"How Do I Miss You" – 4:21
"Hold a Candle to This" – 3:37
"Criminal" – 3:49

Personnel
Chrissie Hynde – guitar (1–3, 5–11), vocals (1–11), backing vocals (6, 7)
Blair Cunningham – drums (1–11), backing vocals (1, 8)

Additional personnel
Billy Bremner – guitar (1–6, 8, 9, 11), backing vocals (1, 3, 8)
John McKenzie – bass guitar (2, 5, 6, 8, 10, 11), backing vocals (8)
Tchad Blake – guitar (4,5)
Mitchell Froom – keyboards (2, 4–6, 9, 11)
Dominic Miller – guitar (7, 10), bass guitar and backing vocals (7)
David Rhodes – guitar (3, 11)
Tim Finn – backing vocals (6)
Mark Hart – backing vocals (6)
Will MacGregor – bass guitar and backing vocals (1)
Teo Miller – backing vocals (3)
Tony "Gad" Robinson – bass guitar and backing vocals (9)
Duane Delano Verh – bass guitar (4)
Adey Wilson – backing vocals (3)
Technical
Tchad Blake – engineer
Geoff Foster, Rob Jaczko, Teo Miller – studio assistants
Jill Furmanovsky – photography

Charts

References

The Pretenders albums
1990 albums
Albums produced by Mitchell Froom
Sire Records albums